King of the Gamblers is a 1948 American crime film directed by George Blair and starring Janet Martin, William Wright and Thurston Hall.

The film's sets were designed by the art director Frank Hotaling.

Cast
 Janet Martin as Jean Lacey  
 William Wright as Dave Fowler  
 Thurston Hall as 'Pop' Morton  
 Stephanie Bachelor as Elsie Pringle 
 George Meeker as Bernie Dupal  
 Wally Vernon as Mike Burns  
 William Henry as Jerry Muller  
 James Cardwell as 'Speed' Lacey  
 Jonathan Hale as Sam Hyland  
 Selmer Jackson as Judge  
 Howard Negley as Jordan  
 John Holland as Symonds  
 George Anderson as O'Brien  
 Ralph Dunn as Cassidy  
 John Albright as Bartender 
 George Eldredge as Saunders (uncredited)
 Vera Marshe as Lorraine (uncredited)
 Clarence Muse as Tom the Porter (uncredited)

References

Bibliography
  Len D. Martin. The Republic Pictures Checklist: Features, Serials, Cartoons, Short Subjects and Training Films of Republic Pictures Corporation, 1935-1959. McFarland, 1998.

External links
 

1948 films
1948 crime films
American crime films
Films directed by George Blair
Republic Pictures films
American black-and-white films
1940s English-language films
1940s American films